The Closed Road is a 1916 American silent drama film directed by Maurice Tourneur and starring House Peters, Barbara Tennant and Lionel Adams.

Cast
 House Peters as Frank Sargeant  
 Barbara Tennant as Julia Annersley  
 Lionel Adams as Dr. Hugh Annersley  
 Leslie Stowe as Dr. Appledan  
 George Cowl as Griswold

References

Bibliography
 Waldman, Harry. Maurice Tourneur: The Life and Films. McFarland, 2001.

External links

1916 films
1916 drama films
Silent American drama films
Films directed by Maurice Tourneur
American silent feature films
1910s English-language films
American black-and-white films
World Film Company films
1910s American films